Postmodern Jukebox, also widely known by the initialism PMJ, is a rotating musical collective founded by arranger and pianist Scott Bradlee in 2011. PMJ is known for reworking popular modern music into different vintage genres, especially early 20th century forms such as swing and jazz. Postmodern Jukebox has amassed over 1.9 billion YouTube views and 5.8 million subscribers.

Each week, Postmodern Jukebox releases a new video on YouTube. Although originally most were filmed casually in Bradlee's living room, sets became more elaborate over time. The band has covered songs by artists ranging from Lady Gaga and The Strokes to Katy Perry and the White Stripes. Since their beginnings as a small group of friends making music in a basement in Queens, New York, Postmodern Jukebox has gone on to feature 70 different performers and tour six continents.

History

Origin

Postmodern Jukebox originated when Scott Bradlee began shooting videos with friends from college in his basement apartment in Astoria. This group included bassist Chris Anderson, saxophonist Ben Golder-Novick, harpist Brandee Younger, and vocalist Emma Walker.

Bradlee struggled for years as a jazz musician in New York City before one of his videos ("a medley of '80s songs done ragtime style")  became popular in 2009. He received a message on Twitter from author Neil Gaiman. Two years later his video for "A Motown Tribute to Nickelback" included Drue Davis (emcee), Steve Ujfalussy (saxophone, EWI) Adam Kubota (bass), Allan Mednard (drums), and Tim Kubart (tambourine).

2012–present
With over one million views in its first week, and four million in its first year, Robyn Adele Anderson's cover version of Macklemore & Ryan Lewis' "Thrift Shop" (2012) was Postmodern Jukebox's first viral music video. The song was included on Introducing Postmodern Jukebox (2013) and reached No. 8 on the Billboard magazine jazz album chart. This was followed by her cover of Miley Cyrus' "We Can't Stop" in 2013. The band performed on Good Morning America in September.

In late 2013, Postmodern Jukebox was invited to the New York City offices of Cosmopolitan to film a year-end tribute to 2013, covering the year's hit songs with arrangements from different genres and times. The "Just Another Day at the Office" mashup included Robyn Adele Anderson singing "Blurred Lines", Cristina Gatti singing "Holy Grail", Anderson and the Tee Tones singing "We Can't Stop", Karen Marie singing "Roar", Ashley Stroud singing "Royals", and Andromeda Turre singing "What Does the Fox Say?". The production was completed in a single take, and a companion behind-the-scenes video was also produced.

In 2014, Kate Davis performed a cover version of Meghan Trainor's song "All About That Bass" (2014) in Scott Bradlee's living room after three hours of practice. Davis sang and played double bass; her rendition gathered 8 million views in three months. "I knew the song, probably could have done it on the fly. Maybe that's why it's so funny. I remember thinking it was so funny at the time I was going to crack up, maybe five times." The 1940s arrangement and piano accompaniment is by Bradlee with Dave Tedeschi on drums. The single was a success, catching the attention of Time, Billboard, The Huffington Post, and PBS NewsHour.

BuzzFeed featured a doo-wop cover of "Timber," with Robyn Adele Anderson and The Tee Tones fronting, in February 2014. The group's cover of Radiohead's seminal 1990s hit "Creep," performed by Haley Reinhart, was called a "stunning listen" by the Los Angeles Times in April 2015. As of April 2022, the video had over 105 million views and was their most viewed video.

In 2015, Broadway actress Shoshana Bean became active with the group as a guest artist when Bradlee moved to Los Angeles. Broadway World raved about Bean's performance of Sia's "Chandelier" at the Segerstrom Center for the Arts in Costa Mesa, California, and Billboard did a feature story on Motown version of Justin Bieber's "Sorry". Bean joined the Postmodern Jukebox 2016 spring European tour at its midway point.

Sara Niemietz performed with the cast in August 2015, covering the Talking Heads' "This Must Be the Place (Naive Melody)" (1983), PMJ's rendition of "Hey Ya!" (2003) by Outkast, a Dixieland arrangement of Justin Bieber's "Love Yourself" (2015), and a club version of the "Pokémon Theme". Niemietz joined the band's northeastern leg of its 2015 U.S. tour and the entire 2016 European tour. MTV U.K. caught up with the show in London and spotlighted a big band cover version of Elle King's "Ex's & Oh's" (2014) with Niemietz on vocals and Sarah Reich tap dancing.

In early February 2016, Postmodern Jukebox covered David Bowie's song "Heroes" in honor of World Cancer Day with vocals by Nicole Atkins. The song was released to earn money for the Cancer Research Institute. In 2016, Heineken announced a global partnership with Formula One racing, and in September released the "If You Drive, Never Drink" campaign commercial with driver Sir Jackie Stewart (the "Flying Scot") and "Heroes" as background music.

Around the same time, PMJ started Reboxed, consisting of new versions of songs that had already been covered. The first Reboxed song was by Niemietz and the Sole Sisters singing "Bad Romance", which had been sung by Ariana Savalas with Sarah Reich tap dancing. Adweek named Bradlee one of "20 Content Creators Who Are Setting the Bar for Creativity in 2016".

In late May 2018, PMJ surpassed the one billion view mark on YouTube. Bradlee, members of the band, and guests hosted their first live stream event from the PMJ Manor to celebrate.

On June 12, 2018, Scott Bradlee released his first book, a memoir entitled Outside The Jukebox: How I Turned My Vintage Music Obsession Into My Dream Gig. The book received positive reviews from  Publishers Weekly, The Weekly Standard, and Billboard.

In 2014, PMJ started the first annual #PMJSearch contest to discover musical talent. The month-long competition asks fans to submit videos of themselves performing versions of PMJ songs for a chance to perform on an upcoming official video. Out of the many videos that are submitted each year, the winner is selected by Scott Bradlee. Past winners include Holly Campbell-Smith (2015), Devi Ananda (2016), Olivia Kuper Harris (2017), and Cortnie Frazier (2019) all of whom went on to be featured in PMJ videos, as well as on tour with the band. Harris' feature on "Last Friday Night" caught the attention of the song's original singer, Katy Perry, during an online feature for Glamour.

Touring 

On February 24, 2016, Postmodern Jukebox opened at the Dubai International Jazz Festival, alongside Sting, Toto, Chris Botti, and David Gray.

The 2016 tours included three continents:
 a 75-date European tour starting at Vicar Street in Dublin, Ireland, wrapping on June 3, 2016 in Athens, Greece.
 A 16-city Australia/New Zealand tour, which kicked off on August 29, 2016 at the Isaac Theatre Royal in Christchurch, wrapping on September 20, 2016 at the Perth Concert Hall. and 
 a 45-stop fall North American tour, kicking off on September 29, 2016 at the Veterans Memorial Auditorium in Providence, Rhode Island, and wrapping on November 27, 2016 in Mesa, Arizona.

The 2017 tour included concurrent dates in Europe and the US, with two separate "casts" of musicians.

PMJ made its first visit of South America in August 2017, with four dates in Brazil and one in Argentina.

In April 2018, PMJ made their debut in Africa, performing in Tunisia at the Jazz a Carthage Festival and Morocco at the Jazzablanca Festival, marking the sixth continent on which they've performed.

Performers

Creator and founder 
 Scott Bradlee – piano, arrangements

Guest musicians 
The band has featured the following artists as guest musicians:

 Adam Kubota – bass
 Allan Mednard – drums
 Allen Hunter – bass
 Andrew Gutauskas – saxophone
 Arthur Vint - drums
 Ben Golder-Novick – saxophone, clarinet
 Bennett Miller – bass
 Brandee Younger – harp
 Chip Thomas – drums
 Cynthia Sayer – banjo
 Dave Koz – saxophone
 Dave Tedeschi – drums
 David Wong – violin
 Erm Navarro – trombone
 Gunhild Carling – various instruments
 Jabu Graybeal – tap dance, drums
 Jacob Scesney – flute, saxophones, clarinet, percussion
 J.P. Floyd - Trombone
 James Hall – trombone
 Jason Prover – trumpet
 Jay Ratmann – clarinet
 Jesse Elder – piano, Rhodes piano
 Joe McDonough – trombone
 Kate Dunphy – accordion
 Kylan deGhetaldi – piano
 Kyle Morgan - saxophone
 Lemar Guillary – trombone
 Marc Trachtenberg - keyboard 
 Michael Sailors – trumpet
 Mike Chisnall – guitar
 Mike Cottone – trumpet
 Molly E. Fletcher – violin
 Nick Finzer – trombone
 Nora Germain - violin, finger snaps
 Ric Becker – trombone
 Robert Edwards – trombone
 Sean Clapis – guitar
 Sean Condron – banjo
 Seth Paris – saxophones
 Stefan Zeniuk – woodwinds
 Tim Kubart aka "Tambourine Guy" – tambourine
 Tom Abbott – clarinet/saxophone
 Tom Luer – saxophone
 Tosin Abasi

Guest vocalists 

Several former American Idol finalists have found success as part of Postmodern Jukebox's ensemble, including Vonzell Solomon (season 4), Blake Lewis (season 6), Melinda Doolittle (season 6), Haley Reinhart (Season 10), Casey Abrams (Season 10), Thia Megia (season 10), and DeAndre Brackensick (season 11). Four Season 14 finalists have also performed lead vocals for the group: Joey Cook, Rayvon Owen, Clark Beckham, and JAX. Additionally, vocalists Aubrey Logan, Von Smith, and Brielle Von Hugel are Idol alums who went through the audition process but did not advance to the finals in any season.

Xavier Woods appeared in the cover of "What Is Love", with his trombone "Francesca" and later recorded a video that was released on his channel (UpUpDownDown), in which they cover the SpongeBob SquarePants theme song.

In February 2020, The Rembrandts appeared as part of an evolution of "I'll Be There for You".

The band has featured the following artists as guest vocalists and performers:

 Ada Pasternak – vocals, violin
 Addie Hamilton – vocals
 Alisan Porter – vocals
 Alex MacDonald - tambourine, tap dancing
 Allison Young - vocals
 Aly Ryan - vocals
 Amber Eyes - vocals
 Annie Goodchild – vocals
 Anissa Lee – tap dancing
 Ariana Savalas – vocals
 Ashley Stroud – vocals
 Aubrey Logan – vocals, trombone
 Bernard Taylor – vocals/Tee-Tone
 Blake Lewis – vocals
 Brielle Von Hugel – vocals
 Candice Parise – vocals
 Catie Turner – vocals
 Caroline Baran – vocals
 Casey Abrams – vocals, bass, melodica
 Chloe Feoranzo – vocals & clarinet 
 Christopher Erk – tap dancing 
 Clark Beckham – vocals
 Cunio - vocals
 Cortnie Frazier – vocals
 Cristina Gatti – vocals
 Dani Armstrong – vocals
 Daniela Andrade – vocals
 David Simmons Jr. - vocals
 DeAndre Brackensick – vocals
 Demi Remick - tap dancing
 Devi-Ananda – vocals
 Emma Hatton – vocals
 Emily Braden – vocals
 Emily Goglia - vocals
 Emily West – vocals
 Eva Mikhailovna – vocals
 Gerard Giddens – vocals/Tee-Tone
 Grace Kelly – vocals, saxophone, swing dancing
 Gunhild Carling – vocals, recorder, trombone, bagpipes, trumpet, tap dancing, harmonica, piano, drums 
 Haley Reinhart – vocals
 Hannah Gill – vocals
 Holly Campbell-Smith – vocals
 Jasmin Walker – vocals
 JAX – vocals
 Jennie Lena – vocals
 Jerome Cohen – vocals/Tee-Tone
 Joey Cook – vocals, ukulele, accordion
 Juliette Goglia – vocals, dancing
 Karen Marie – vocals
 Kate Davis – vocals, upright bass
 Kelley Jakle – vocals
 Kenton Chen – vocals
 Kiah Victoria – vocals
 Ksenia Parkhatskaya – swing dancing
 Lara Johnston – vocals
 Lauren Molina – cello
 LaVance Colley – vocals
 Lisa Gary – vocals
 Luke Edgemon – vocals
 Maiya Sykes – vocals
 Mario Jose – vocals
 Maris - vocals
 Martina DaSilva – vocals
 Matt Bloyd – vocals
 Mayré Martínez – vocals
 Melinda Doolittle – vocals
 Melinda Sullivan – tap dancing
 Miche Braden – vocals
 Morgan James – vocals
 Mykal Kilgore – vocals
 Natalie Angst – vocals
 Niia – vocals
 Nicole Atkins – vocals
 Noah Guthrie – vocals
 Olivia Kuper Harris – vocals
 Pia Toscano – vocals
 Puddles the Clown – vocals
 Rayvon Owen  vocals
 Robyn Adele Anderson – vocals
 Sara Niemietz – vocals
 Sarah Reich – tap dancing
 Sarah Marie Young – vocals, ukulele
 Scotty Grand – vocals, flute
 Scout Ford – vocals/Tee-Tone
 Shoshana Bean – vocals
 Stefano Langone – vocals
 Sunny Holiday – vocals, dancing, choreography
 Tara Louise – vocals
 Thia Megia – vocals
 Tickwanya Jones – vocals
 Tomasina Abate – vocals
 Tony DeSare – vocals, piano
 Von Smith – vocals
 Vonzell Solomon – vocals
 Wayne Brady – vocals
 Wilkie Ferguson – vocals

Discography

Albums

References

External links 
 

2011 establishments in New York City
American jazz ensembles from New York City
Cover bands
Musical groups established in 2011
Musical groups from New York City
Jazz musicians from New York (state)
American Internet celebrities